Hưng Long is a ward and seat of Chơn Thành town, Bình Phước Province, Vietnam.

References

Populated places in Bình Phước province